Le Clos du Peyronnet is an Arts and Crafts garden on Avenue Aristide Briand in Menton, in the Alpes-Maritimes department on the French Riviera. The gardens of the villa were designed by Humphry Waterfield in the early 20th-century, and has remained in the ownership of the Waterfield family ever since. Though privately owned, the garden is occasionally open to the public.

The garden is located on a strictly sloping site divided into terraces, with a series of cascading pools filtering into a fishpond at the bottom.

References

External links
Le Clos du Peyronet on Menton's official website

Arts and Crafts gardens
French Riviera
Gardens in Menton